

Medalists

Results

Green denotes finalists

2015 European Diving Championships